Carkeek is a surname. Notable people with the surname include:

 Arthur Carkeek (1843–1897), member of the Armed Constabulary in the New Zealand Wars
 Barlow Carkeek (1878–1937), Australian sportsman who played cricket and Australian rules football
 Guendolen Plestcheeff (1892–1994), Seattle, Washington preservationist and arts advocate; born Guendolen Carkeek
 Jack Carkeek (1861–1924), American Cornish champion wrestler from Rockland, Michigan United States
 Stephen Carkeek (1815–1878), New Zealand civil servant
 Vernon Carkeek (1893–1968), Australian footballer
 Vivian Carkeek (1879–1934), Seattle, Washington lawyer

See also
 Carkeek Park, 216-acre (87.1 ha) park located in the Broadview neighborhood of Seattle, Washington
 Carkeek Observatory, earliest surviving astronomical observatory in New Zealand